Göran Sonnevi (born 3 October 1939 in Lund, Skåne County) is a Swedish poet and translator. Sonnevi grew up in Halmstad; he studied literature and linguistics at the University of Lund, also getting librarian training. For many years he has lived in Järfälla outside Stockholm.

Sonnevi is one of the most esteemed poets of modern Sweden and is known as well as a successful and conscientious translator (e.g. of Osip Mandelstam, Ezra Pound and Friedrich Hölderlin). Some of his poems look into topical and political matters of the contemporary scene: the Vietnam War, the Cold War and its ending phases, globalization, immigration and ethnic/cultural conflicts, 9/11 and the Iraq War (both mentioned in the long titular suite of Oceanen), but his conclusions are more searching than easy. The rhythmic and musical qualities of his free verse, with sharp line breaks in the middle of phrases or long, flowing and building lines, are present even when he brings in formal or highly specialized scientific expressions. His work has been translated into several languages.

Awards and honors
In 2005, he won the Swedish Academy Nordic Prize, known as the 'little Nobel'. In 2006, he won The Nordic Council's Literature Prize for his collection Oceanen (the Ocean).

Bibliography 
Outfört (1961)
Abstrakta dikter (1963)
ingrepp-modeller (1965)
och nu! (1967)
Det gäller oss. Dikter 1959–1968 (1969)
Det måste gå (1970)
Det oavslutade språket (1972) ('The unfinished language')
Dikter 1959–1973 (1974) ('Poems 1959–1973')
Det omöjliga (1975) ('The Impossible')
Språk; Verktyg; Eld (1979) ('Language; Tools; Fire')
Dikter 1959–1972, rev. utg. (1981) ('Poems 1959–1972, revised edition' – two poems which were later included in Det omöjliga have been edited out)
Små klanger; en röst (1981) ('Tiny sonorities; a voice')
Dikter utan ordning (1983) ('Poems without order')
Oavslutade dikter (1987) ('Unfinished poems')
Trädet (1991) ('The Tree')
Mozarts tredje hjärna (1996) ('Mozart's third brain')
Klangernas bok (1998) ('Book of Chords')
Oceanen (2005) ('The Ocean')

External links
Göran Sonnevi – the poet who won the Nordic Council’s Literature Prize 2006
Poems by Göran Sonnevi in the online journal Typomag – translated from the Swedish by Rika Lesser
Poems by Göran Sonnevi in Words Without Borders – translated from the Swedish by Rika Lesser
 Göran Sonnevi's poem "In the Darkness of Voices" in New Poetry in Translation – translated from the Swedish by Rika Lesser

1939 births
Living people
People from Lund
20th-century Swedish poets
Dobloug Prize winners
Nordic Council Literature Prize winners
Swedish translators
Translators to Swedish
Swedish male poets
21st-century Swedish poets
20th-century translators
21st-century translators
20th-century Swedish male writers
21st-century male writers